Patricia Noel Driscoll (17 December 1927 – 2 January 2020) was a British and Irish actress, who has appeared both on television and in films.

Television work
Trained as an actress at RADA, Driscoll made her first television appearances in 1953 on Whirligig and then as a police sergeant in the series Scotland Yard in the episode "The Silent Witness". From 1955 to 1957, she introduced Picture Book, a BBC Television series that appeared on Mondays as part of the Watch with Mother cycle and encouraged children to make things.  She had a catchphrase: "Do you think you could do this? – I am sure you could if you tried". Driscoll left Picture Book in 1957 to take over from Bernadette O'Farrell the part of Maid Marian opposite Richard Greene in the ITV series The Adventures of Robin Hood for 37 episodes in series 3 and 4. Her place in Picture Book was taken by Vera McKechnie in a further series in 1962–63.

Driscoll’s other numerous television appearances included: The Vise (1958), Hawaiian Eye (1959), Westinghouse Desilu Playhouse: Murder in Gratitude (1959), Danger Man (1961 & 1964), Second Time Around (six episodes, 1974), The Good Life (1977), Kidnapped (mini-series, 1978), and Into The Labyrinth (1981). One of her last roles used her voice in an animation called Bye-Bye Bin Laden (2009).

Filmography

Personal life and death
Driscoll was married to British actor Duncan Lamont until his death from a heart attack at the age of 60 in 1978. He too had appeared in The Adventures of Robin Hood. They had two children together.

She died in Kent on 2 January 2020, at the age of 92.

References

External links
Biographical information

1927 births
2020 deaths
British film actresses
British television actresses
Educational broadcasting in the United Kingdom
Irish film actresses
Irish television actresses
People from County Cork